Dennis Bekkers (born November 29, 1980 in Den Bosch) is a taekwondo practitioner from the Netherlands.

Bekkers competes in men's -68 kilograms class also known as the featherweight. He won the silver medal at the 2005 European Championships in Riga, Latvia. That same year he also won the bronze medal at the World Championships in Madrid, Spain. In 2006, he managed to improve his European record by becoming European Champion, in Bonn. In 2007, at the Pre-Olympic World Championships in Beijing, he won another bronze medal. In 2008, at the European Championships in Rome, he won the bronze medal. With this performance he managed to qualify for the 2008 Summer Olympics in Beijing.

References

1980 births
Living people
Dutch male taekwondo practitioners
Taekwondo practitioners at the 2008 Summer Olympics
Olympic taekwondo practitioners of the Netherlands
Sportspeople from 's-Hertogenbosch
European Taekwondo Championships medalists
World Taekwondo Championships medalists
21st-century Danish people